Anna Ritchie may refer to:
 Anna Ritchie (archaeologist), British archaeologist and historian
 Anna Cora Mowatt, also Ritchie, American writer

See also
 Anne Isabella Thackeray Ritchie, English writer